Saidabad (also Romanized as Saʿīdābād; also known as Seyyedābād) is a village in Darzab Rural District, in the Central District of Mashhad County, Razavi Khorasan Province, Iran. At the 2006 census, its population was 460, in 97 families.

References 

Populated places in Mashhad County